Bani Zaid (or Bani Zayd) may refer to:

 Bani Zeid, A tribe in Palestine
 Banu Zayd, A Nejdi Tribe